The men's 400 metres at the 2022 World Athletics Indoor Championships took place on 18 and 19 March 2022.

Summary
The top three sent-finalists are seeded into the outer three lanes.  In a fast race on the tight turns of an indoor track, that is significant.  Carl Bengtström, Jereem Richards and Trevor Bassitt won those honors.  Running lanes for the first two turns, Richards seized a slight advantage over Bassitt, with Bengtström right on his heels.  After the break, Richards cut sharply to the pole, cutting off Bassitt and seizing the lead.  This forced Bassitt to try to figure out how to get past Richards while both were running at top speed.  At first Bassitt entered the third turn in lane 2 to make space but couldn't see a way around.  Through the penultimate straightaway, Bassit closed to just outside of Richards, gapping Bengtström.  Bassitt ran high on the lane line through the final turn then drifted to lane three for running room to the finish line.  As Bassitt closed ground with every step, Richards noticeably tightened and started leaning for the finish line almost 20 metres before the finish line.  Both athletes leaned for the finish line, with Richards eking out a .05 victory.

After the race, Richards name checked Deon Lendore, who had been killed in a car crash two months earlier, for being a leader and inspiration.  He wanted to "make him proud."

Results

Heats
Qualification: First 2 in each heat (Q) and the next 2 fastest (q) advance to the Semi-Finals

The heats were started on 18 March at 11:00.

Semifinals
Qualification: First 3 in each heat (Q) advance to the Final

The heats were started on 18 March at 19:15.

Final
The final was started on 19 March at 20:15.

References

400 metres
400 metres at the World Athletics Indoor Championships